Benjamin Amadeo DeLuzio (born August 9, 1994) is an American professional baseball outfielder in the Chicago Cubs organization. He made his Major League Baseball debut with the St. Louis Cardinals in 2022.

Amateur career
DeLuzio was born in St. Louis, Missouri, but grew up in Orlando, Florida, where he attended The First Academy and played football and baseball. As a senior in 2013, he hit .424 with 21 RBIs. He was selected by the Miami Marlins in the third round of the 2013 Major League Baseball draft, but did not sign and instead enrolled at Florida State University to play college baseball for the Florida State Seminoles.

DeLuzio was a part of Florida State's starting lineup for all three seasons of his collegiate career. In both 2014 and 2015, he played in the Cape Cod Baseball League for the Hyannis Harbor Hawks.

Professional career

Arizona Diamondbacks 
DeLuzio went unselected in the 2016 Major League Baseball draft following his junior season and signed with the Arizona Diamondbacks as a free agent. He spent six years as a member of the Diamondbacks organization, and reached as high as Triple-A with the Reno Aces in 2019 and 2021.

St. Louis Cardinals 
After the 2021 season, the St. Louis Cardinals selected DeLuzio in the minor league phase of the 2021 Rule 5 draft. The Cardinals assigned him to the Memphis Redbirds to open the 2022 season.

On September 1, 2022, the Cardinals selected DeLuzio's contract and promoted him to the major leagues. He was non tendered and became a free agent on November 18, 2022.

Chicago Cubs 
On December 13, 2022, DeLuzio signed a minor league deal with the Chicago Cubs.

See also
Rule 5 draft results

References

External links

1997 births
Living people
Baseball players from St. Louis
Sportspeople from St. Louis
Major League Baseball outfielders
St. Louis Cardinals players
Florida State Seminoles baseball players
Hyannis Harbor Hawks players
St. Cloud Rox players
Arizona League Diamondbacks players
Visalia Rawhide players
Hillsboro Hops players
Kane County Cougars players
Amarillo Sod Poodles players
Reno Aces players
Memphis Redbirds players
Jackson Generals (Southern League) players
2023 World Baseball Classic players